Aviston is a village in Clinton County, Illinois, United States. The population was 2,340 at the 2020 census, up from 1,945 at the 2010 census.

Geography
U.S. Route 50 bypasses the village to the north, leading east  to Carlyle, the county seat, and west  to Interstate 64 near O'Fallon.

Demographics

As of the 2020 census there were 2,340 people, 739 households, and 515 families residing in the village. The racial makeup of the village was 94.36% White, 0.34% African American, 0.47% Native American, 0.51% Asian, 0.04% Pacific Islander, 0.73% from other races, and 3.55% from two or more races. Hispanic or Latino of any race were 2.52% of the population.

There were 739 households, out of which 77.13% had children under the age of 18 living with them, 59.00% were married couples living together, 7.17% had a female householder with no husband present, and 30.31% were non-families. 23.95% of all households were made up of individuals, and 9.61% had someone living alone who was 65 years of age or older. The average household size was 3.37 and the average family size was 2.82.

The village's age distribution consisted of 26.9% under the age of 18, 7.1% from 18 to 24, 29.4% from 25 to 44, 24.1% from 45 to 64, and 12.5% who were 65 years of age or older. The median age was 35.2 years. For every 100 females, there were 99.0 males. For every 100 females age 18 and over, there were 97.6 males.

The median income for a household in the village was $81,198, and the median income for a family was $108,304. Males had a median income of $50,833 versus $40,852 for females. The per capita income for the village was $36,182. About 3.9% of families and 3.0% of the population were below the poverty line, including 2.9% of those under age 18 and 4.2% of those age 65 or over.

Schools
 Aviston Elementary School
 Central Community High School - Formed as a consolidation of the Breese and Aviston high schools in 1971

Notable people

 Henry J. Althoff, Roman Catholic bishop
 Vern Holtgrave, pitcher for the Detroit Tigers
 Trevor Richards, pitcher for the Toronto Blue Jays

References

External links

 Village of Aviston official website

Villages in Clinton County, Illinois